Convicted computer criminals are people who are caught and convicted of computer crimes such as breaking into computers or computer networks. Computer crime can be broadly defined as criminal activity involving information technology infrastructure, including illegal access (unauthorized access), illegal interception (by technical means of non-public transmissions of computer data to, from or within a computer system), data interference (unauthorized damaging, deletion, deterioration, alteration or suppression of computer data), systems interference (interfering with the functioning of a computer system by inputting, transmitting, damaging, deleting, deteriorating, altering or suppressing computer data), misuse of devices, forgery (or identity theft) and electronic fraud.

In the infancy of the hacker subculture and the computer underground, criminal convictions were rare because there was an informal code of ethics that was followed by white hat hackers. Proponents of hacking claim to be motivated by artistic and political ends, but are often unconcerned about the use of criminal means to achieve them. White hat hackers break past computer security for non-malicious reasons and do no damage, akin to breaking into a house and looking around. They enjoy learning and working with computer systems, and by this experience gain a deeper understanding of electronic security. As the computer industry matured, individuals with malicious intentions (black hats) would emerge to exploit computer systems for their own personal profit.

Convictions of computer crimes, or hacking, began as early as 1984 with the case of The 414s from the 414 area code in Milwaukee. In that case, six teenagers broke into a number of high-profile computer systems, including Los Alamos National Laboratory, Sloan-Kettering Cancer Center and Security Pacific Bank. On May 1, 1984, one of the 414s, Gerald Wondra, was sentenced to two years of probation. In May, 1986, the first computer trespass conviction to result in a jail sentence was handed down to Michael Princeton Wilkerson, who received two weeks in jail for his infiltration of Microsoft, Sundstrand Corp., Kenworth Truck Co. and Resources Conservation Co.

In 2006, a prison term of nearly five years was handed down to Jeanson James Ancheta, who created hundreds of zombie computers to do his bidding via giant bot networks or botnets.  He then sold the botnets to the highest bidder who in turn used them for Denial-of-service (DoS) attacks.

, the longest sentence for computer crimes is that of Albert Gonzalez for 20 years. The next longest sentences are those of 13 years for Max Butler, 108 months for Brian Salcedo in 2004 and upheld in 2006 by the U.S. 4th Circuit Court of Appeals, and 68 months for Kevin Mitnick in 1999.

Computer criminals

See also
Timeline of computer security hacker history

References

External links

Convicted computer criminals
Hacking (computer security)
Lists of criminals